ANAPROF 2000–01 is the 2000-2001 season of the Panamanian football league, ANAPROF.  The season started on July 28, 2000 and finalized on February 2, 2001 when Panama Viejo was crowned champions after defeating Tauro 4-3.

Teams

Standings

Results table
 Please note that the home teams are read down the left hand side while the away teams are indicated along the top.

Final round

Hexagonal

Semifinals

1st Leg

2nd Leg

Final

Top goal scorers

Local derby statistics

El Super Clasico Nacional - Tauro v Plaza Amador

References
RSSF ANAPROF 2000-01

ANAPROF seasons
1
Pan